Simonki is a rural locality (a village) in Frolovskoye Rural Settlement, Permsky District, Perm Krai, Russia. The population was 26 as of 2010. There are 9 streets.

Geography 
Simonki is located 31 km southeast of Perm (the district's administrative centre) by road. Molokovo is the nearest rural locality.

References 

Rural localities in Permsky District